The 10th Vanier Cup was played on November 22, 1974, at Exhibition Stadium in Toronto, Ontario, and decided the CIAU football champion for the 1974 season. The Western Mustangs won their second championship by defeating the Toronto Varsity Blues by a score of 19–15.

References

External links
 Official website

Vanier Cup
Vanier Cup
Vanier Cup
Vanier Cup
Canadian football competitions in Toronto